Graceland Cemetery is a large historic garden cemetery located in the north side community area of  Uptown, in the city of Chicago, Illinois, United States.  Established in 1860, its main entrance is at the intersection of Clark Street and Irving Park Road. Among the cemetery's  are the burial sites of several well-known Chicagoans.

Graceland includes a naturalistic reflecting lake, surrounded by winding pathways, and its pastoral plantings have led it to become a certified arboretum of more than 2,000 trees.  The cemetery's wide variety of burial monuments include a number designed by famous architects, several of whom are also buried in the cemetery.

History
Thomas Barbour Bryan, a Chicago businessman, established Graceland Cemetery in 1860 with the original  layout designed by Swain Nelson. Bryan's son, Daniel Page Bryan, was the first person to be buried at the cemetery after having been disinterred and removed from the city cemetery in Lincoln Park along with approximately 2,000 other individuals. In 1870, Horace Cleveland designed curving paths, open vistas, and a small lake to create a park-like setting. In 1878, Bryan hired his nephew Bryan Lathrop as president. In 1879, the cemetery acquired an additional , and Ossian Cole Simonds was hired as its landscape architect to design the addition. Lathrop and Simonds wanted to incorporate naturalistic settings to create picturesque views that were the foundation of the Prairie style. Lathrop was open to new ideas and provided opportunities for experimentation which led to Simonds use of native plants including oak, ash, witch hazel, and dogwood at a time when many viewed native plants as invasive. The Graceland Cemetery Association designated one section of the grounds to be devoid of monuments and instituted a review process led by Simonds for monuments and family plots. Simonds later became the superintendent at Graceland until 1897, and continued on as a consultant until his death in 1931.

Graceland Cemetery was added to the National Register of Historic Places on January 18, 2001.

Geography 
Graceland Cemetery is an example of a rural cemetery, which is a style of cemetery characterized by landscaped natural areas. The concept of the rural cemetery emerged in the early 19th century as a response to overcrowding and poor maintenance in existing cemeteries in Europe.

In the 19th century, a train to the north suburbs occupied the eastern edge of the cemetery, where the Chicago "L" train now runs. The line was also used to carry mourners to funerals, in specially rented funeral cars. As a result, there was an entry through the east wall, which has since been closed. When founded, the cemetery was well outside the city limits of Chicago. After the Great Chicago Fire in 1871, Lincoln Park, which had been the city's cemetery, was deconsecrated and some of the bodies were reinterred to Graceland Cemetery.

The edge of the pond around Daniel Burnham's burial island was once lined with broken headstones and coping transported from Lincoln Park. Lincoln Park was redeveloped as a recreational area. A single mausoleum remains, the "Couch tomb", containing the remains of Ira Couch. The Couch Tomb is probably the oldest extant structure in the city, everything else having been destroyed by the Great Chicago Fire.

The cemetery's walls are topped off with wrought iron spear point fencing.

Notable tombs and monuments
Many of the cemetery's tombs are of great architectural or artistic interest, including the Getty Tomb, the Martin Ryerson Mausoleum (both designed by architect Louis Sullivan, who is also buried in the cemetery), and the Schoenhofen Pyramid Mausoleum. The industrialist George Pullman was buried at night, in a lead-lined coffin within an elaborately reinforced steel-and-concrete vault, to prevent his body from being exhumed and desecrated by labor activists.

William Hulbert, the first president of the National League, has a monument in the shape of a baseball with the names of the original National League cities on it.

Along with its other famous burials, the cemetery is notable for two statues by the renowned Chicago sculptor Lorado Taft, Eternal Silence for the Graves family plot and The Crusader that marks Victor Lawson's final resting place.

The cemetery is also the final resting place of 31 victims of the Iroquois Theatre fire, in which more than 600 people died.

Notable burials

 David Adler, architect
 Walter Webb Allport, dentist
 John Peter Altgeld, Governor of Illinois
 Amabel Anderson Arnold, organized the Woman's State Bar Association of Missouri, the first association of women lawyers in the world
 Philip Danforth Armour, meat packing magnate
 Ernie Banks, Chicago Cubs Hall of Fame baseball player
 Frederic Clay Bartlett, artist, art collector
 Granville Bates, American actor
 Mary Hastings Bradley, author
 Lorenz Brentano, member of the State House of Representatives, United States consul at Dresden, Congressional Representative for Illinois
 Doug Buffone, Chicago Bears former linebacker, host WSCR
 Daniel H. Burnham, architect
 Fred A. Busse, mayor of Chicago
 Justin Butterfield, attorney, land grant developer
 Lydia Avery Coonley, author
 Oscar Stanton De Priest first African American in the 20th century to be elected to Congress.
 William Deering, founder of Deering Harvester Company, which later became International Harvester Company, father of James and Charles Deering
 James Deering, executive of Deering Harvester Company and original owner of the Villa Vizcaya estate
 Charles Deering, executive of Deering Harvester Company, former chairman of International Harvester Company, and philanthropist
 Augustus Dickens, brother of Charles Dickens (he died penniless in Chicago)
 Roger Ebert, film critic, journalist, screenwriter, author
 George Elmslie, architect
 John Jacob Esher (1823–1901), Bishop of the Evangelical Association
 Marshall Field, businessman, retailer, whose memorial was designed by Henry Bacon, with sculpture by Daniel Chester French
 Bob Fitzsimmons, Heavyweight boxing champion, born in Cornwall, UK
 Melville Fuller, Chief Justice of the United States
 Elbert H. Gary, judge, chairman of U.S. Steel
 Bruce A. Goff, architect
 Sarah E. Goode, first African-American woman to receive a United States patent
 Bruce Graham, co-architect of John Hancock building and Sears Tower (now called the Willis Tower)
 Dexter Graves was an early pioneer in the city who arrived on the schooner Telegraph in the 1830s. His memorial by Lorado Taft is the statue Eternal Silence (also known as "the Dexter Graves Monument").
 Richard T. Greener, first black graduate of Harvard (1870), first black professor at the University of South Carolina (1873–1877), administrator for the Ulysses S. Grant Memorial, and diplomat to Russia
 Marion Mahony Griffin, architect
 Carter Harrison, Sr., mayor of Chicago
 Carter Harrison, Jr., mayor of Chicago
 Herbert Hitchcock, US Senator from South Dakota
 William Holabird, architect
 Henry Honoré, businessman, father of Bertha Honoré Palmer, father-in-law of Potter Palmer
 William Hulbert, president of baseball's National League
 Charles L. Hutchinson, banker, philanthropist and founding president of the Art Institute of Chicago
 William Le Baron Jenney, architect, Father of the American skyscraper
 Elmer C. Jensen, "The Dean of Chicago Architects"
 Jack Johnson, first African-American heavyweight boxing champion
 William Johnson, educator who served as superintendent of Chicago Public Schools
 John and Mary Richardson Jones, husband-and-wife abolitionists and activists
 Fazlur Khan, co-architect of John Hancock building and Sears Tower (now called the Willis Tower)

 William Wallace Kimball, Kimball Piano and Organ Company
 John Kinzie, Canadian pioneer, early white settler in the city of Chicago
 Cornelius Krieghoff, well-known Canadian artist
 Bryan Lathrop, businessman, philanthropist, and longtime president of the cemetery
 Robert Henry Lawrence Jr., first African American astronaut (cremated at Graceland, but not physically buried there)
 Victor F. Lawson,  editor and publisher of the Chicago Daily News
 Agnes Lee, poet and translator
 Frank Lowden, Governor of Illinois
 Franklin H. Martin, physician
 Alexander C. McClurg, bookseller and Civil War general
 Cyrus McCormick, businessman, inventor
 Edith Rockefeller McCormick, Daughter-in-law of reaper inventor Cyrus McCormick and one of the four adult children of John D. Rockefeller
 Katherine Dexter McCormick, Daughter-in-law of reaper inventor Cyrus McCormick, MIT grad, biologist, suffragist, philanthropist
 Maryland Mathison Hooper McCormick, second wife of Col. Robert R. McCormick
 Nancy "Nettie" Fowler McCormick, businesswoman, philanthropist
 Joseph Medill, publisher, mayor of Chicago
 Ludwig Mies van der Rohe, architect
 László Moholy-Nagy, influential photographer, teacher, and founder of the New Bauhaus and Institute of Design IIT in Chicago
 Dawn Clark Netsch, comptroller of Illinois, professor & spouse of architect Walter Netsch
 Walter Netsch, architect
 Richard Nickel, photographer, architectural historian and preservationist
 Ruth Page, dancer and choreographer
 Bertha Honoré Palmer, philanthropist
 Francis W. Palmer, newspaper printer, U.S. Representative, Public Printer of the United States
 Potter Palmer, businessman
 Richard Peck, author
 Allan Pinkerton, detective, progenitor of the Secret Service
 William Henry Powell, Medal of Honor recipient
 George Pullman, inventor and railway industrialist
 Wilhelm Rapp, newspaper editor
 Hermann Raster, newspaper editor, politician and abolitionist
 John Wellborn Root, architect
 Howard Van Doren Shaw, architect
 Washington Smith, pioneer wholesale grocer and philanthropist. The Washington and Jane Smith Home (now Smith Village) was named in his honor.
 Louis Sullivan, architect
 Charles Wacker, businessman and philanthropist, also director of the 1893 Columbian Exposition<ref>Lanctot. Barbara, ‘’A Walk Through Graceland Cemetery: A Chicago Architecture Foundation Walking Tour, A Chicago Architecture Foundation Walking Tour, Chicago, IL, 1992 p. 30</ref>
 Kate Warne, first female detective, Allan Pinkerton employee
 Hempstead Washburne, mayor of Chicago
 Daniel Hale Williams, African-American surgeon who performed one of the first successful operations on the pericardium
 George Ellery Wood, lumber baron. His home, built in 1885, on 2801 S. Prairie Ave. in Chicago, IL is a historical landmark

Other cemeteries in the city of Chicago
Graceland is one of three large mid 19th-century Chicago cemeteries which were then well outside the city limits; the other two being Rosehill (further north), and Oak Woods (on the south-side) all in the elaborated pastoral cemetery style.

In addition, directly south of Graceland across Irving Park Road are the smaller German Protestant Wunder's Cemetery (1859), and adjacent Jewish Graceland Cemetery (divided by a fence), established in 1851.  The Roman Catholic, Saint Boniface Cemetery (1863), is four blocks north of Graceland at the corner of Clark and Lawrence.

See also
 List of mausoleums
 United States National Cemeteries

Notes

Further reading
 Hucke, Matt and Bielski, Ursula (1999) Graveyards of Chicago: the people, history, art, and lore of Cook County Cemeteries, Lake Claremont Press, Chicago
 Kiefer, Charles D., Achilles, Rolf, and Vogel, Neil A. "Graceland Cemetery" (PDF), National Register of Historic Places Registration Form, HAARGIS Database, Illinois Historic Preservation Agency, June 18, 2000, accessed October 8, 2011.
 Lanctot, Barbara (1988) A Walk Through Graceland Cemetery, Chicago Architectural Foundation, Chicago, Illinois
 Vernon, Christopher (2012) Graceland Cemetery:  A Design History''. Amherst, MA: Library of American Landscape History and University of Massachusetts Press.

External links

 
 
 "Graceland a Poem" by Carl Sandburg

1860 establishments in Illinois
Cemeteries in Chicago
Cemeteries on the National Register of Historic Places in Illinois
National Register of Historic Places in Chicago
Rural cemeteries